I Am - SM Town Live World Tour in Madison Square Garden is a 2012 South Korean documentary film directed by Choi Jin-sung, that is about 32 SM Town K-pop artists on their journey to become the first Asian singers to stage their milestone SMTown Live '10 World Tour concert at Madison Square Garden in New York. The film was originally scheduled for release in South Korea on 10 May 2012, but was postponed to 21 June 2012, due to audio issues.

Synopsis 
The movie follows 32 artists from SM Town as they rehearse and go about their daily lives.

Cast
Kangta
BoA
TVXQ: U-Know Yunho, Max Changmin
Super Junior: Leeteuk, Yesung, Shindong, Sungmin, Eunhyuk, Donghae, Siwon, Ryeowook, and Kyuhyun.
Girls' Generation: Taeyeon, Sunny, Tiffany, Hyoyeon, Yuri, Sooyoung, Yoona, Seohyun and Jessica.
Shinee: Onew, Jonghyun, Key, Minho, and Taemin 
f(x): Victoria, Amber, Luna, Krystal and Sulli.

Music
On April 24, 2012, SM Town released the film's theme song, "Dear My Family", along with its music video. It is a remake of the song of the same name from Yoo Young-jin’s 2001 third album and 2002 Winter Vacation in SMTown.com – My Angel My Light performed by Kangta, Moon Hee-joon, S.E.S., Shinhwa, Fly to the Sky and BoA.  The 2012 version is performed by BoA, Kangta, TVXQ, Yesung of Super Junior, Taeyeon of Girls' Generation, Jonghyun of Shinee, Luna of f(x) and Baekhyun, D.O., Luhan & Chen of EXO.
A newer remake was released on SMTOWN's YouTube page on December 29, 2017. The music video contains footage from a SMTOWN concert that took place before the passing of former SHINee member Jonghyun, who plays a vital role in both the song and video.

International releases

United States: July 13–19, 2012 at CGV CINEMAS in LA 
Indonesia: May 18–20, 2012 at the Blitz Megaplex theater in Jakarta.
Hong Kong: May 18–30, 2012
Singapore: May 25, 2012
Taiwan: May 25, 2012
Japan: June 2, 2012
Thailand: July 7–8, 2012 (Only in Paragon Cineplex at Siam Paragon, Bangkok)
Vietnam: June 22, 2012

DVD releases

Japan:  October 3, 2012
United States: November 6, 2012
Taiwan: October 19, 2012
Hong Kong: September 25, 2012
Korea: September 27, 2012
Thailand: December 6, 2012

References

External links 
  

2012 films
2012 documentary films
South Korean documentary films
Documentary films about singers
Films shot in Seoul
Films shot in New York City
CJ Entertainment films
2010s Korean-language films
SM Town
Documentary films about South Korea
Films directed by Choi Jin-sung
Documentary films about K-pop
2010s South Korean films